The members of the 4th General Assembly of Newfoundland were elected in the Newfoundland general election held in 1848. The general assembly sat from December 14, 1848, to 1852.

With the passing of the Newfoundland Act of 1847 by the British Parliament, the members of the Legislative Council once again sat separately from the assembly, ending the experiment with unicameralism started in 1842. The first session of the assembly was held in a building owned by a member of the legislature. For the second session which started in 1850, the assembly met in the newly constructed Colonial Building.

John Kent was chosen as speaker.

Sir John Le Marchant served as civil governor of Newfoundland.

Members of the Assembly 
The following members were elected to the assembly in 1848:

Notes:

By-elections 
By-elections were held to replace members for various reasons:

Notes:

References 

Newfoundland
004